Icon is a compilation album by American country music artist George Strait. It was released on September 13, 2011. The album is part of a series of similar Icon albums released by Universal Music Enterprises. As of December 2012, the album has sold 212,000 copies.

Track listing

Chart positions

Weekly charts

Year-end charts

Certifications

References

2011 compilation albums
George Strait compilation albums
MCA Records compilation albums